Hellawell is a surname. Notable people with the surname include:

John Hellawell (born 1943), English footballer
Keith Hellawell (born 1942), English businessman and police officer
Mike Hellawell (born 1938), English footballer
Piers Hellawell (born 1956), British classical composer

See also